, short for  ( "Supreme Commander of All German Forces in the East"), was both a high-ranking position in the armed forces of the German Empire as well as the name given to the occupied territories on the German section of the Eastern Front of World War I, with the exception of Poland. It encompassed the former Russian governorates of Courland, Grodno, Vilna, Kovno and Suwałki. It was governed in succession by Paul von Hindenburg and Prince Leopold of Bavaria, and collapsed by the end of World War I.

Extension
 was set up by Kaiser Wilhelm II in November 1914, initially came under the command of Paul von Hindenburg, a Prussian general who had come out of retirement to achieve the German victory of the Battle of Tannenberg in August 1914 and became a national hero.

By October 1915, the Imperial German Army had advanced so far to the east that central Poland could be put under a civil administration. Accordingly, the German Empire established the Government General of Warsaw and the Austro-Hungarian Empire set up the Government General of Lublin. The military Ober Ost government from then on controlled only the conquered areas east and north of central Poland.

After the signing of the Treaty of Brest-Litovsk of March 1918, the German Empire effectively controlled Lithuania, Latvia, Belarus, parts of Poland, and Courland, all of which had been part of the Russian Empire.  itself controlled present-day Lithuania, Latvia, Belarus, Poland, and Courland.

Policies

 governed in a very strict and often cruel way. The movement policy divided the territory without regard to the existing social and ethnic organization and patterns. Movement between the districts was forbidden, which destroyed the livelihood of many merchants and prevented people from visiting friends and relatives in neighboring districts. The Germans also tried to "civilize" the people in the Ober Ost-controlled land, attempting to integrate German ideals and institutions with the existing cultures. They constructed railroads but only Germans were allowed to ride them and schools were established and staffed with German instructors.

In 1915, when large territories came under Ober Osts administration as a result of military successes on the Eastern Front, Erich Ludendorff, von Hindenburg's second-in-command, set up a system of managing the large area now under its jurisdiction. Although von Hindenburg was technically in command, Ludendorff had actual control of the administration. There were ten staff members, each with a specialty (finance, agriculture, etc.). The area was divided into the Courland District, the Lithuania District and the Bialystok-Grodno District, each overseen by a district commander. Ludendorff's plan was to make Ober Ost a colonial territory for the settlement of his troops after the war and to provide a haven for German refugees from Russia. Ludendorff quickly organized Ober Ost so that it was a self-sustaining region, growing all its own food and even exporting surpluses to Berlin. The largest resource was one that Ludendorff was unable to exploit effectively: the local population had no interest in helping obtain a German victory, as it had no say in the government and was subject to increasing requisitions and taxes.

Communication with locals
Among the upper-class locals, the soldiers could get by with French or German, and in large villages, the Jewish population would speak German or Yiddish, "which the Germans would somehow comprehend". In the rural areas and amongst peasant populations soldiers had to rely on interpreters who spoke Lithuanian, Latvian or Polish. The language problems were not helped by the thinly-stretched administrations, which would sometimes number 100 men in areas as large as Rhode Island. The clergy at times had to be relied upon to spread messages to the masses since that was an effective way of spreading a message to people who speak a different language. A young officer-administrator named  related that he listened (through a translator) to a sermon by a priest who told his congregation to stay off highways after nightfall, hand in firearms and not to have anything to do with Bolshevist agents, exactly as  had told him to do earlier.

Russian Revolution
The uncertain situation caused by the Russian October Revolution in 1917 and the Treaty of Brest-Litovsk in March 1918 made some indigenes elect Duke Adolf Friedrich of Mecklenburg as head of the United Baltic Duchy and the second duke of Urach as king of Lithuania, but those plans collapsed in November 1918.

Administrative divisions
In 1917 the following districts existed:

Main military units in 1919
 the 10th Army ( or ), Commanding Officer , Grodno
 the Army Group Mackensen

Aftermath
With the end of the war and collapse of the empire, the Germans started to withdraw, sometimes in a piecemeal and disorganized way, from  around late 1918 and early 1919. In the vacuum left by their retreat, conflicts arose as various former occupied nations declared independence, clashing with the various factions of the Russian Revolution and subsequent Civil War, and with each other. For details, see:
Soviet westward offensive of 1918–19, part of the Polish–Soviet War (the largest of the resulting conflicts)
Ukrainian–Soviet War and Polish–Ukrainian War
Estonian War of Independence
Latvian War of Independence
Lithuanian Wars of Independence

Parallels with Nazi German policy
The Lithuanian historian Vėjas Gabrielius Liulevičius postulates in his book War Land on the Eastern Front: Culture, National Identity, and German Occupation in World War I, that a line can be traced from s policies and assumptions to Nazi Germany's plans and attitudes towards Eastern Europe. His main argument is that "German troops developed a revulsion towards the 'East' and came to think of it as a timeless region beset by chaos, disease and barbarism", instead of what it really was, a region suffering from the ravages of warfare. He claims that the encounter with the East formed an idea of "spaces and races", which needed to be "cleared and cleansed". Although he has garnered a great deal of evidence for his thesis including government documents, letters and diaries in German and Lithuanian, there are still problems with his work. For example, he does not say much about the reception of German policies by native populations.

See also

Notes

References

Further reading
 
 
 
 

German Empire in World War I
1910s in Lithuania
Poland in World War I
1910s in Belarus
1914 establishments in Europe
1919 disestablishments in Europe
States and territories established in 1914
States and territories disestablished in 1919
Military occupation